The 29th Golden Bell Awards was held on 26 March 1994 at the Sun Yat-sen Memorial Hall in Taipei, Taiwan. The ceremony was broadcast by China Television (CTV).

Winners

References

1994
1994 in Taiwan